Gehr is a German language surname. Such as the related Gehrig, Gehring, Gering and Gerling it belongs to the group of family names derived from given names – in this case from any of several compound names of Germanic origin with the beginning element ger (e. g. Gerhardt, Gerhold, Gerald, Gerwin, Gerd or Gernot) – and may refer to:
Ernie Gehr (born 1941), American experimental filmmaker
Ferdinand Gehr (1896–1996), Swiss painter
Herbert Gehr (1911–1983), Jewish American photographer and television director
Mary Gehr (1913–1997), American painter and printmaker

References 

German-language surnames
Surnames from given names